Lee Sang-yun (born July 16, 1974) is a South Korean professor. Lee Sang-Yun is one of South Korea's leading marine engineers. With regard to the ferry Sewol (MV Sewol) sinking disaster which took place on April 16, 2014, Lee addressed that many risk elements caused the accident in stages, namely, unqualified personnel, passing Maengol waterway with the strong current in the fast speed, overloading, the shortage of ship ballast equilibrium water, subsequently, he developed the real time ship-risk monitoring & disaster prevention system and the national integrated disaster prevention system related technology and system for precaution or countermeasure against disasters and applied for the patents thereon and decided to donate them to the government organizations or private companies for the public interest as of May 16, one month after the tragedy. Lee is listed in a high school text book of S.Korea as 'The engineering professor who is engineering our future'.

Selected publications

Research in Academic Journals

Books
Lee, Sang-yun, 가토다쓰야에게 준 500일의 반성기회 : 한국은 왜 가토다쓰야를 용서했나 Forgiveness and regret, Tatsuya Kato (journalist), 리얼뉴스 (2017), 
Lee, Sang-yun, 안철수의 승부 : 국민의당 성공전략은 무엇인가? Ahn Cheol-soo's game, 리얼뉴스 (2017), 
Lee, Sang-yun, 마따이따이 하록선장, 다시 날다! : 한 남자의 진짜 이야기 : 영한합본 Mataitai captain Harock rising up again!, 리얼뉴스 (2017), 
Lee, Sang-yun, 행정공간정보화(化) 플랫폼 전자정부론 Electronic government as platform for spatial informatization of public administration, 높은새 (2015), 
Lee, Sang-yun, 박근혜 벗기기 : 안철수 등의 한판 승부 Park Geun-hye as the top candidate for 2012 presidential election of South Korea against Ahn Cheol-soo and Korean left-wing politicians, 높은새 (2011), 
Lee, Sang-yun, 과학기술과 국제정치 : 한국의 글로벌 해양전략 Scientific technology and international relations : global marine strategy for Korea, 높은새 (2011), 
Lee, Sang-yun, 기술, 배, 정치 : 기술, 배, 정치는 세계패권을 어떻게 바꿨는가? Technology, politics and ships, 높은새 (2010), 
Lee, Sang-yun, 대통령 만들기 : 게임이론과 죄수의 딜레마 President election strategy game theory prisoner's dilemma, 높은새 (2009), 
Lee, Sang-yun, 하록선장, 다시 날다 : 마따이따이 에피소드 1, 에세이 (2008),

Patents
Unmanned Aerial Vehicle System operated by smart eyeglass (Application number:  KR20130069600A)
Unmanned Aerial Vehicle System for monitoring jellyfish and trip currents, water-bloom (Application number:  KR20130069334A)
A torpedo system of underwater deception type (Application number:  KR20130001332A)
Complex Unmanned Aerial Vehicle System for Low and High-altitude (Application number:  KR20130001350A)
Micro-robot of Bacterium base with Targeted Cancer-Cells Removal Function
Simulator System for Micro-nano Robot using 3D-Display Device system
Micro-robot moved by Compressive Fluid
KEEL FOIDED INTO A CENTERBOARD (Application number: KR20100096657A)
A Augmented Reality System for Micro-Nano Robot
Simulator System for Micro-nano Robot Using Real-Time Characteristic Data
Auto-docking system for Complex Unmanned Aerial Vehicle
Unmanned Aerial Vehicle for Precision Strike of Short-range
Unmanned Aerial Vehicle Network System with spatial information technology
Complex Unmanned Aerial Vehicle System for Low and High-altitude
Micro-robot operated by Electromagnetic Coupled Resonance
e-government system as platform with customized public services
platform system of e-government with open data integration system of cloud computing
Wireless Charging System in Car for Mobile Phones and Devices

References

Academic staff of Pusan National University
Living people
Marine engineers
Year of birth missing (living people)